The Holy Man's Rebellion, took place between March 1901 and January 1936. It started when supporters of the Phu Mi Bun religious movement initiated an armed rebellion against French Indochina and Siam, aiming at installing their leader, sorcerer Ong Keo, as ruler of the world. By 1902 the uprising was put down in Siam, continuing in French Indochina until being fully suppressed in January 1936.

Background
Before the Monthon reforms initiated by king Chulalongkorn, Siamese territories were divided into three categories: Inner Provinces forming the core of the kingdom, Outer Provinces that were adjacent to the inner provinces and tributary states located on the border regions. The area of southern Laos that came under Siamese control following the Lao rebellion (1826–1828) and destruction of Vientiane belonged to the later category, maintaining relative autonomy. Lao nobles who had received the approval of the Siamese king exercised authority on the Lao population as well as the Alak and Laven-speaking tribesmen. Larger tribal groups often raided weaker tribes abducting people and selling them into slavery at the trading hub of Champasak, while themselves falling prey to Khmer, Lao and Siamese slavers. From Champasak the slaves were transported to Phnom-Penh and Bangkok, thus creating a large profits for the slavers and various middlemen. In 1874 and 1884, king Chulalongkorn enacted two decrees banning the capture and sale of Kha slaves while also freeing all slaves born after 1868. Those abolitionist policies had an immediate effect on slave trading communities.
 
In 1883, France attempted to expand its control in Southeast Asia by claiming that the Treaty of Huế extended into all Vietnamese vassal states. French troops gradually occupied the Kontum Plateau and pushed the Siamese from Laos following the Franco-Siamese War. A new buffer zone was thus created on the west bank of Mekong. As the area lacked the presence of the Siamese military, local outlaws flocked the newly created safe haven. In 1899, Siam abolished the tributes collected from vassal states, replacing them with a new tax collected from all able bodied men, undermining the authority of Lao officials. The combined effects of the abolitionist laws and taxation led the Lao and Kha  nobility into an open rebellion.

Conflict
In late March 1901, the French Commissioner of Saravane formed a small band of militiamen in order to investigate the popular gatherings organised by sorcerer Ong Keo on the Phou Kat mountain. Ong Keo had managed to gain a large following among the Alak, Sedang, Loven and Nha-heun tribals who venerated him as a proto-Bodhisattva, creating the millenarian Phu Mi Bun (Ruler of Justice) movement. On 12 April, the French patrol was ambushed by 1,500 Kha tribals, the commissioner managed to flee back to Saravane. Nevertheless, news of the uprising began spreading in the surrounding areas. On 29 May, Sedang rebels attacked a French outpost outside Kon Tum killing the commanding officer.

A prophecy then began circulating in Northeast Siam, various prophets claimed that a great catastrophe was going to take place in May 1901, while Phu Mi Bun would emerge as the ruler of the world. Ong Keo was expected to turn stones into gold and gold into stones, prompting his followers to collect stones and ceremonially kill animals in preparation for the event. In June 1901, a number of Lao chiefs proclaimed their allegiance to Ong Keo, and  set fire to buildings along the Sedone river.  In March 1902, the uprising spread into Siam after Ong Keo's officer Ong Man proclaimed himself to be the Phu Mi Bun and gathered a group of armed followers. On 28 March, Ong Man's troops raided Khemmarat in Siam, executing two officials, abducting the governor while also burning and looting the town. Siamese commissioner Sanphasitthiprasong responded by dispatching 400 soldiers to Surin, Srisaket, Yasothon, and Ubon. In the meantime, Ong Man had gathered 1,000 followers setting camp at Ban Sapheu. In the aftermath of a rebel ambush 9 Siamese soldiers were killed, the victory attracted 1,500 new followers to Ong Man's camp. A force of 100 soldiers and two cannons was then created, tasked with tracking Ong Man. On 3 April 1902, Siamese troops ambushed a rebel column outside Ubon, killing 300 and capturing 400 militants, the guerrillas that managed to survive the encounter fled to Laos.

In late April, a large group of chanting militants surrounded the French commissariat at Savannakhet. Believing that the French ammunition would turn into frangipani flowers, 150 rebels were slain and an equal number were wounded. The insurgents then relocated to the Phou Luong mountains, ceasing their activities until 1905. On 30 November 1905, insurgents massacred 41 Loven tribesmen in Ban Nong Bok Kao. Renewed French operations forced Ong Keo to surrender; however, he soon fled to Siam only to return to Laos and resume his struggle in the Bolovens Plateau. In 1910, Ong Keo was assassinated by French representative Fendler during peace negotiations, Fendler had hidden a pistol under his hat which remained undetected as the head was not searched according to Lao customs. Ong Keo's officer Ong Kommandam then assumed command of the rebels before being shot in January 1936. Khomadam's death put an end to the rebellion.

See also

 Lao rebellion (1826–1828)
 Haw wars (1865–1890)
 Paknam Incident (1893)
 War of the Insane (1918–1921)

Further reading 

 Baird, I. G. (June 01, 2013). Millenarian movements in southern Laos and North Eastern Siam (Thailand) at the turn of the twentieth century: Reconsidering the involvement of the Champassak house royal. South East Asia Research, 21, 2, 257-279.

References

Rebellions in Thailand
Separatism in Thailand
Conflicts in 1901
Conflicts in 1902
Conflicts in 1905
Conflicts in 1936
Conflicts in 1935
1902 in Siam
1901 in Siam
1900s in Laos
1901 in Asia
1902 in Asia
Wars involving Laos
Wars involving Thailand
Wars involving Vietnam
France–Thailand relations
Mass murder in 1905
Rama V period
1905 murders in Asia